State Route 224 (SR 224) is a primary state highway in the U.S. state of Virginia. Known as Wadlow Gap Road, the state highway runs  from the Tennessee state line, where the highway continues as Tennessee State Route 93 (SR 93), north to U.S. Route 58 (US 58) and US 421 in Weber City.

Route description

SR 224 begins at the Tennessee state line at Wadlow Gap, a wind gap in a low range of hills between Carter Valley to the north and the larger valley to the south that contains Kingsport. Wadlow Gap Road continues south toward that city as SR 93. SR 224 heads north and crosses the Carter Valley, then crosses Long Ridge before crossing the North Fork Holston River. The state highway veers west and curves back east around Pine Ridge before reaching its northern terminus at US 58 and US 421 (Hilton Road) a short distance to the east of Moccasin Gap on the eastern edge of the town of Weber City, where US 58 and US 421 intersect US 23.

Major intersections

References

External links

Virginia Highways Project: VA 224

224
State Route 224